Palazzo Pio can refer to:

 Palazzo Orsini Pio Righetti, a building erected on parts of the remains of the Theater of Pompey in Rome
 Palazzo Pio (Borgo), a building in the Borgo district of Rome and extraterritorial property of the Holy See. It hosts the Canadian and Taiwanese embassies to the Holy See.